OSS 117 – Double Agent (also known as OSS 117: Murder for Sale or No Roses for OSS 117 (Pas de Roses pour OSS 117)) is a 1968 Eurospy film about agent OSS 117, starring John Gavin.

Cast
 John Gavin as Hubert Bonisseur de La Bath, alias OSS 117, alias William Chandler
 Margaret Lee as Aïcha Melik
 Curd Jürgens as the Major
 Luciana Paluzzi as Maud the doctor
 Robert Hossein as Dr Saadi
 Rosalba Neri as Conchita
 George Eastman as Karas
 Guido Alberti as Farouk Melik
 Piero Lulli as Heinrich Van Dyck
 Renato Baldini as MacLeod
 Luciano Bonanni as a policeman

Production
Frederick Stafford did not reprise his role as he was filming Alfred Hitchcock's Topaz and was replaced by John Gavin. The film used an idea of having the hero undergo plastic surgery to fool his enemies, an idea discarded by the film On Her Majesty's Secret Service (1969) that was being filmed at the same time.

The film was shot in Rome and Tunisia. It was known during production as No Roses for Robert.

Reception
The film was only a moderate success at the box office in France – the 40th most popular film of the year.

It was not released in the US despite Gavin's presence in the lead role. However the film did help Gavin be cast, briefly, as James Bond in Diamonds Are Forever (1971).

References

External links
 
Review of film at The Lucid Nightmare
Review of movie at Double O blogsite

1968 films
1960s action films
1960s spy thriller films
French spy thriller films
English-language French films
Italian spy thriller films
English-language Italian films
Films shot in Rome
Films shot in Tunisia
Films scored by Piero Piccioni
French sequel films
1960s English-language films
1960s Italian films
1960s French films